Anything for You may refer to:

"Anything for You" (Gotham), a television episode
"Anything for You" (Bonnie Pink song), 2007
"Anything for You" (Gloria Estefan and Miami Sound Machine song), 1988
"Anything for You" (Snow song), 1995
"(I Would Do) Anything for You", a jazz standard written by Alex Hill, Claude Hopkins, and Bob Williams, 1932
"Anything for You", a song written by George and Ira Gershwin for the stage musical A Dangerous Maid, 1921
"Anything for You", a song by Mr. Big from Mr. Big, 1989
"Anything for You", a song by Lee Harding from What's Wrong with This Picture?, 2006